Mesi may refer to:

People
Joe Mesi (born 1973), American boxer
Sam Mesi (1900–1971), Chicago mobster 
Senida Mesi (born 1997), Albanian politician

Others
the MESI protocol
Mesi, Naxos, a village on the island of Naxos, Greece
Middle East Strategic Information (MESI), a pro-Israel news/media analysis project

See also
Messi (disambiguation)